Pseudoqolus koko is a species of catfish in the family Loricariidae and the only species in the genus Pseudoqolus. It is a freshwater fish native to South America, where it occurs in the Maroni basin. It is usually found on or near stony substrates in the main river channel at a depth of around 2 m (6.6 ft). The species has been collected alongside multiple other loricariid species, including Hemiancistrus medians, Peckoltia otali, Pseudancistrus barbatus, Harttia guianensis, Loricaria cataphracta, and Rineloricaria stewarti. It is noted that the gut contents of one specimen of this species contained primarily spicules and sponge fragments, indicating that it may feed on freshwater sponges. The species reaches 9 cm (3.5 inches) SL.

Pseudoqolus koko was originally described as a member of the genus Panaqolus (a genus which is sometimes thought to be a subgenus of Panaque) in 2012, although it was reclassified as a member of the monotypic genus Pseudoqolus by Nathan K. Lujan, Christian A. Cramer, Raphael Covain, Sonia Fisch-Muller, and Hernán López-Fernández following a 2017 molecular phylogenetic analysis. P. koko has been stated to be morphologically, ecologically, and biogeographically distinct enough to warrant placement in this genus instead of Panaqolus.

References 

Ancistrini
Catfish of South America
Fish described in 2012
Monotypic ray-finned fish genera